Theobald's tomb bat (Taphozous theobaldi) is a species of sac-winged bat in the family Emballonuridae. It is found in India, Indonesia, Myanmar, Thailand, and Vietnam.

References

Taphozous
Bats of Asia
Bats of South Asia
Bats of Southeast Asia
Mammals of India
Mammals of Vietnam
Taxa named by George Edward Dobson
Mammals described in 1872
Taxonomy articles created by Polbot

Bats of India